"Role Model" is a song by American rapper Eminem, that features on his major-label debut album The Slim Shady LP. The song also appears on the deluxe edition of his compilation album, Curtain Call: The Hits. Released as a single on May 26, 1999, following "My Name Is", a music video was made, using the heavily censored radio edit. It became a minor hit on the US charts.

Critical reception
David Browne described this: "In Role Model, he gleefully debunks the idea of rappers as heroes (So if I said I never do drugs, that would mean I lie and get f ---ed more than the President does)." RapReviews highlighted following lyrics: "I get a clean shave, bathe, go to a rave/ Die from an overdose and dig myself up out of my grave/ My middle finger won't go down, how do I wave?/ And this is how I'm supposed to teach kids how to behave?"

Music video
The video is a darker comedic offering than "My Name Is", directed by Dr. Dre and Phillip G. Atwell. The opening of the song, where Eminem announces his attempt to drown himself, is left out. In the video, there's a scene where Eminem is transformed into an animated superhero and attacks a chicken character that resembles Foghorn Leghorn from Looney Tunes.

Track listing
 Promotional CD single

 12" vinyl

Charts

Certifications

References

1999 singles
Eminem songs
Black comedy music
Songs written by Eminem
Songs written by Dr. Dre
Aftermath Entertainment singles
Interscope Records singles
1999 songs
Horrorcore songs
Comedy rap songs